Diaphania innotata is a moth in the family Crambidae. It was described by Herbert Druce in 1895. It is found from Mexico to Panama.

References

Moths described in 1895
Diaphania